Darryll James "D. J." Foster (born November 22, 1993) is a former gridiron football running back who is currently the manager of player development at Arizona State University, where he played college football. He signed with the New England Patriots as an undrafted free agent in 2016. He was a member of the Super Bowl LI winning Patriots, though was inactive for the game itself.

High school career
Foster attended Saguaro High School in Scottsdale, Arizona, where he rushed for more than 5,000 yards in his career. As a senior, he set an Arizona state single-season record with 60 total touchdowns, and also set state marks for rushing yards in a game (508), touchdowns in a game (10), touchdowns in a career, points in a career and points in a season. He helped lead his team to the Arizona Division III State Championship to cap off his high school career. He was chosen by the Arizona Republic as the Big Schools Player of the Year in 2011, and also was named the 2011 Tribune Football Player of the Year by the East Valley Tribune.

Considered a four-star recruit by Rivals.com, he was rated as the 5th best athlete prospect of his class, and drew comparisons to Greg Jennings. On January 27, 2012, he announced his commitment to Arizona State over offers from Cal, Nebraska, Oregon, and USC.

College career

Freshman season
He played in all 13 games, making one start. He scored his first career touchdown against Missouri. He finished second on the team in all-purpose yardage with 1,026 yards (493 rushing and 533 receiving), and recorded six total touchdowns (two rushing, four receiving).

Sophomore season
He entered the season ready for an increased role with the team. He led the nation in receiving yards by a running back and was second overall on the team (653). He finished second on the team in all-purpose yardage (1,170 yards) and ranked second on the team in receptions (63). He totaled 10 total touchdowns for the season (six rushing, four receiving). He had ASU’s only touchdowns (one rush, one receiving) against Stanford in the Pac-12 Championship.

Junior season
Following the departure of Marion Grice, Foster took over as the main back and offensive weapon for the Sun Devils. On the season, he had 194 carries for 1,081 rushing yards and nine rushing touchdowns to go along with 62 receptions for 688 receiving yards and six receiving touchdowns.

Senior season
On December 30, 2014, Foster announced he would return to Arizona State for his senior season as a wide receiver. Overall, on the 2015 season, he had 59 receptions for 584 receiving yards and three receiving touchdowns to go along with 55 carries for 280 rushing yards and a rushing touchdown.

Statistics

Professional career
Coming out of Arizona State, Foster was projected by many analysts to be either a fifth round selection or priority free-agent. He was ranked the 23rd best running back out of the 204 available by NFLDraftScout.com.

Foster went undrafted in the 2016 NFL Draft, and was signed by the Patriots as a rookie free agent.

New England Patriots
On September 3, 2016, Foster was announced to have made the Patriots final 53-man roster and he made his professional debut on September 18, 2016, in the Patriots 31–24 win over the Miami Dolphins in Week 2. He was released by the Patriots on November 28, 2016, and was re-signed to the practice squad. He was promoted back to the active roster on December 3, 2016. On February 5, 2017, Foster's Patriots appeared in Super Bowl LI. He was inactive for the game. In the game, the Patriots trailed 28–3 in the third quarter, but rallied all the way back to win the game by a score of 34–28 against the Atlanta Falcons, in a game that featured the first overtime Super Bowl and largest comeback in Super Bowl history.

Foster was released by the Patriots on September 2, 2017, and signed to the practice squad the next day.

Arizona Cardinals
On September 12, 2017, Foster was signed by the Arizona Cardinals off the Patriots' practice squad. In the 2017 season, he appeared in seven games and had 17 receptions for 133 receiving yards.

On August 27, 2018, Foster suffered a torn MCL and ACL in the Cardinals' third preseason game and was ruled out for the season.

On October 28, 2019, Foster was placed on injured reserve with a hamstring injury.

On March 27, 2020, Foster re-signed with the Cardinals. Foster was released during final roster cuts on September 5, 2020, and re-signed to the practice squad a day later. He was elevated to the active roster on September 12 and 19 for the team's weeks 1 and 2 games against the San Francisco 49ers and Washington Football Team, and reverted to the practice squad after each game. Foster suffered a quadriceps injury in the Washington game, and he was placed on the practice squad/injured list on September 21. He was activated back to the practice squad on October 20. He was elevated to the active roster again on November 7, November 14, November 19, November 28, and December 5 for the team's weeks 9, 10, 11, 12, and 13 games against the Miami Dolphins, Buffalo Bills, Seattle Seahawks, New England Patriots, and Los Angeles Rams, and reverted to the practice squad after each game. Foster was promoted to the active roster on December 19.

Toronto Argonauts
On July 19, 2021, Foster signed with the Toronto Argonauts of the Canadian Football League. He played in 10 regular season games where he had 82 carries for 332 yards and two rushing touchdowns and also had 33 receptions for 316 yards and two receiving touchdowns. He also played in the East Final where he had 11 carries for 38 yards and three catches for 57 yards in the loss to the Hamilton Tiger-Cats. He was released by the Argonauts on May 6, 2022, after the signing of Andrew Harris.

References

External links
Toronto Argonauts bio
New England Patriots bio
Arizona State Sun Devils football bio

1993 births
Living people
African-American players of American football
Players of American football from Scottsdale, Arizona
American football running backs
Arizona State Sun Devils football players
New England Patriots players
Arizona Cardinals players
Toronto Argonauts players
21st-century African-American sportspeople
Ed Block Courage Award recipients